Gallegos is a Spanish surname. It is a regional name denoting someone from Galicia. Notable people with the surname include:

People
Alphonse Gallegos (1931–1991), American Roman Catholic bishop
 Antonio Hernández Gallegos (1912−1973), Mexican Roman Catholic bishop
 Benjamín Gallegos Soto (1960–2018), Mexican politician 
Carlos Gallegos (born 1992), Mexican boxer
Chon Gallegos (born 1939), American football player
 Daniel Arévalo Gallegos (born 1962), Mexican politician 
 Daniela Múñoz Gallegos (born 1984), Mexican tennis player
 Dave Gallegos (born 1969), American Top Fuel Racer 
 David Gallegos (first elected 2012), American politician
Deborah E. Gallegos, 2005 Chief Investment Officer for New York City
 Dezi Gallegos (born 1995), American playwright
 Doreen Gallegos (first elected 2012), American politician
 Eduardo Gallegos (born 1992), Mexican footballer 
 Elena Gallegos Rosales (1882–1954), Salvadoran-born First Lady of Costa Rica
Erinea Garcia Gallegos (1903–2002), American educator and postmistress
 Eva Ramón Gallegos (published ca. 1999–2019), Mexican scientist
 Ezequiel Gallegos (born 1991), Argentine professional footballer 
Felipe Gallegos (born 1991), Chilean footballer
Fernando Talaverano Gallegos (1563–1619), Spanish lawyer and colonial administrator
 Giovanny Gallegos (born 1991), Mexican MLB baseball pitcher
Gracie Gallegos (first elected 2007), American politician
Joaquín Gallegos Lara (1909–1947), Ecuadorian novelist and essayist
 Joe Gallegos (born 1941), American politician
 José Antonio Hurtado Gallegos (born 1955), Mexican politician 
 Jose Gallegos (born 2001), American soccer player
 José Gallegos y Arnosa (1857–1917), Spanish painter and sculptor
José Guadalupe Gallegos (1828–1867), American politician and Civil War soldier
José Manuel Gallegos (1815–1875), American Roman Catholic priest and politician
José Manuel Gallegos Rocafull (1895–1963), Spanish priest and philosopher
José Rafael Gallegos (1784–1850), Costa Rican head of state
 Justin Gallegos (born 1998/99), American professional runner with cerebral palsy
 Lucila Gallegos Camarena (born 1961), Mexican politician
 Luis Gallegos (born 1946), Ecuadorian diplomat
Luisa Gallegos (born 1929), American AAGPBL baseball player
 Margarita Gallegos Soto (born 1962), Mexican politician 
Mario Gallegos Jr. (1950–2012), American politician
 Mariquita Gallegos (born 1940), Argentine singer and actress
Martin Gallegos (first elected 1994), American politician and chiropractor
 Mary Gallegos (first elected 2002), American politician
 Matías Gallegos (born 1997), Argentine footballer 
Neveah Gallegos (2004–2007), American murdered by her mother's live-in boyfriend
Pedro de Répide Gallegos (1853–1947), Spanish writer and journalist
 Ramón Gallegos Nava (born 1959), Mexican psychologist
 Rey Gallegos, Mexican actor (first credit 1994)
Reyna Gallegos, Mexican wrestler who debuted in 1980
 Robert Gallegos (born 1957/58), American politician
 Rocío Reza Gallegos (born 1968), Mexican politician 
 Rodolfo Landeros Gallegos (born 1931), Mexican politician
Rómulo Gallegos (1884–1969), Venezuelan novelist and politician
Sebastián Gallegos (born 1992), Uruguayan footballer
Sharon Lee Gallegos (1955–1960), American murder victim
Tony Gallegos (1924–2018), American businessman and politician
 Wenceslao Díaz Gallegos (1834–1895), Chilean scientist and medical surgeon

See also
Gallego (surname)
Gallego (disambiguation)
Galicia (Spain), place of origin for Gallego, Gallegos and los Gallegos names for "those from Galicia"
Rómulo Gallegos Prize

Spanish-language surnames
Surnames of Spanish origin
Ethnonymic surnames